Deane Roscoe Gundlock (11 August 1914 – 10 September 1986) was as a Canadian farmer and politician. He served as Member of Parliament in the Lethbridge riding from 1958 to 1972. From 1963-1964, Gundlock served as the Critic for National Revenue. In 1964, Gundlock became the Assistant Critic for National Revenue.

Gundlock was born at Warner, Alberta and was a farmer by trade.

References

External links
 

1914 births
1986 deaths
Canadian farmers
Members of the House of Commons of Canada from Alberta
Progressive Conservative Party of Canada MPs